Milwrick Flying "M" Airport  is a privately owned, public use airport located three nautical miles (6 km) northeast of the central business district of Lincoln, a village in Alcona County, Michigan, United States. It was formerly known as Flying "M" Ranch Airport.

Facilities and aircraft 
The airport covers an area of 10 acres (4 ha) at an elevation of 830 feet (253 m) above mean sea level. It has one runway designated 9/27 with a turf surface measuring 2,200 by 90 feet (671 x 27 m). For the 12-month period ending December 31, 2010, the airport had 100 general aviation aircraft operations, an average of 8 per month.

References

External links 
 Aerial image as of April 1999 from USGS The National Map

Airports in Michigan
Transportation in Alcona County, Michigan